The Longkesh Ramblers, later Crubeen, was a 1970s Irish folk band from Newry, County Down, Northern Ireland. They recorded and produced all their material in Dublin.
Clanrye Records was a self made record label.

Background
The Longkesh Ramblers Debut Album 'Songs of the Irish People'

Personnel

Billy Fegan: tin whistle, Harmonica and Vocal       
Eddie Ruddy: Flute, Whistle, and Concertina
Barney Gribben: Banjo, mandolin, Concertina and Harmonica
Tommy Hollywood: Guitar, mandolin and Vocal
Rory O'Connor: Guitar and Vocal
Benny McKay: bodhran and Vocal

Songs of the Irish People Track listing 1974

Release history

References and recordings

1974 albums